XMDF (ever-eXtending Mobile Document Format) is a file format for viewing electronic books.  It was originally developed by Sharp Corporation for its Zaurus platform.  It is primarily used in Japan.

References

Computer file formats
Electronic paper technology
Ebooks